International Institute of Information Technology may refer to one of several unrelated higher-education institutes in India:

 International Institute of Information Technology, Bangalore, in Karnataka, India
 International Institute of Information Technology, Bhubaneswar, in Odisha, India
 International Institute of Information Technology, Hyderabad, in Telangana, India
 International Institute of Information Technology, Naya Raipur, in Chhattisgarh, India
 International Institute of Information Technology, Pune, in Maharashtra, India

See also
 Indian Institutes of Information Technology